Obersüßbach is a municipality  in the district of Landshut in Bavaria in Germany.

People 
 Georg Kaspar Nagler (1801-1866), art historian

References

Landshut (district)